Monotominae is a subfamily of root-eating beetles in the family Monotomidae. There are about 10 genera and more than 80 described species in Monotominae.

Genera
These 10 genera belong to the subfamily Monotominae:
 Aneurops Sharp, 1900
 Bactridium LeConte, 1861
 Europs Wollaston, 1854
 Hesperobaenus LeConte, 1861
 Leptipsius Casey, 1916
 Macreurops Casey, 1916
 Monotoma Herbst, 1793
 Phyconomus LeConte, 1861
 Pycnotomina Casey, 1916
 Thione Sharp, 1899

References

Further reading

External links

 

Monotomidae
Articles created by Qbugbot